The 2012–13 Serie B (known as the Serie bwin for sponsorship reasons) is the 81st season since its establishment in 1929. A total of 22 teams will contest the league: 16 of which returning from the 2011–12 season, 4 of which promoted from Lega Pro Prima Divisione, and two relegated from Serie A. Puma replaced Nike as manufacturer of the official Serie B match ball, a relationship that continues today.

The league featured two clubs relegated from Serie A: Novara returned to the second division after only a single season in the top flight, whereas Cesena were relegated after a two-year stint.

Four teams were promoted from Lega Pro Prima Divisione, one of them returning to Serie B after a significant absence and one of them will play Serie B for the first time in their history, Pro Vercelli after 64 years, Ternana after 6 years, while Spezia will take part to Serie B after 4 years. The fourth promoted team, Virtus Lanciano will make debut in Serie B.

Grosseto and Lecce were provisionally, not yet enforceable, condemned to relegation to Lega Pro Prima Divisione, due to a large match fixing scandal involving Italian football; both clubs appealed the decision to the Italian Football Federation's Court of Justice. In appeal, Grosseto was acquitted from all charges and readmitted to Serie B, whereas Lecce's relegation was confirmed. Lecce already announced its intention to appeal the decision at the TNAS (National Sports Arbitration Court, at the Italian Olympic Committee level), but not blocking the relegation being immediately enforceable. On 23 August 2012, FIGC officially communicated that Vicenza were to replace Lecce, and there has been a possibility of extending the transfer window as regards Grosseto and Vicenza.

Changes from last season

Team changes

From Serie B
Promoted to Serie A
 Pescara
 Torino
 Sampdoria

Relegated to Lega Pro Prima Divisione
 AlbinoLeffe
 Gubbio
 Nocerina

To Serie B
Relegated from Serie A
 Novara
 Cesena

Promoted from Lega Pro Prima Divisione (Girone A)
 Ternana
 Pro Vercelli 

Promoted from Lega Pro Prima Divisione (Girone B)
 Spezia
 Virtus Lanciano

Teams

Stadia and locations

Personnel and kits

Managerial changes

League table

Promotion play-offs
The higher placed team plays the second leg of the promotion playoff at home. If scores are tied after both games in the semifinals the higher placed team progresses to the final. The same conditions apply to the final except for there being extra time played if scores are tied after both games, the higher placed team will be promoted if scores are still level at the end of this period.

Results

Top goalscorers
As of 13 May 2013.
24 goals
 Daniele Cacia (Hellas Verona)
22 goals
 Matteo Ardemagni (Modena)
21 goals
 Francesco Tavano (Empoli)
20 goals
 Paulinho (Livorno)
19 goals
 Marco Sansovini (Spezia)
18 goals
 Simone Zaza (Ascoli)
17 goals
 Osarimen Ebagua (Varese)
 Massimo Maccarone (Empoli)
16 goals
 Francesco Caputo (Bari)
15 goals
 Andrea Caracciolo (Brescia)
 Davide Succi (Cesena)

References

Serie B seasons
2
Italy